Monkayo, officially the Municipality of Monkayo,  is a 1st class municipality in the province of Davao de Oro, Philippines. According to the 2020 census, it has a population of 93,937 people, making it the most populous town in the province.

Monkayo is an agricultural town, with vast tracts of land planted to rice and banana. The municipality is also host to the gold-rich barangay of Mount Diwata, popularly known as "Diwalwal" (which in the local dialect means one's tongue is hanging out due to exhaustion), a 1,000-meter high range known for its rich gold ore deposit.

Monkayo's seat of government is located in Barangay Poblacion.

Etymology
The Municipality of Monkayo is a political unit with a land area that was once and for a long period of time a wilderness in the Northern hinterlands of Davao de Oro. The name “Monkayo” is derived from a gigantic tree towering on top Tandawan mountains and its northern tip in between and immediately adjacent to the Agusan River. The tree is called “Mondabon Kayo” (Mondabon Tree). It was however shortened by the first settlers of the area as “Monkayo”.

In the other related version, it is believed that a certain Fr. Ladour, the first missionary priest assigned in the area, gave the place the name of Moncayo, a snow-topped mountain dividing the kingdoms of Aragon and Castile, in Spain, probably as an analogy to the high mountains in the area that reminded him of his own place of birth.

History
Monkayo belonged to the northern hinterland of what is now called Davao de Oro. It was occupied by Lumad groups such as the Mandaya, Manobo, Mansaka, Manguangan and Dibabawon people who dwelt on primitive life and lived by hunting, fishing and crude method of farming (Kaingin) long before the Spanish conquistadors penetrated deep in Mindanao in the middle part of the 18th century. These different tribes or groups, each had a bagani as head or chief. They wore clothing and armed with bladed weapons and bows and arrows, they sang hymns called Tudom and long narrative songs called Owaging they danced and held rituals, feasted and chewed beetle nuts. Nevertheless, when Spanish missionaries came, these natives changed their lives and attitudes and eventually receptive to Christian teachings and ultimately embraced Christianity. Today, this municipality still has Mandaya, Dibabawon, Manguangan and Manobo, other tribes have transferred to other places.

Monkayo became a Municipality District in 1917. The position given to the highest official was District President. The first one appointed to the position was Adolfo Mongado, the first Mandayan educator who served from 1917 to 1925. The other prominent leaders who held the same position were : Ignacio Cervantes – 1926–1933; Ildefonso Labrador – 1934–1935; and Pedro Aroma – 1936–1937. The title of the position was changed to District Mayor in 1938 with the following officials: Jose Ibañez who served from 1938 to 1939, followed by Feliciano Cervantes who held the position from 1940 up to the end of the World War II.

During the Second World War, Monkayo was made an important military outpost. The 81st Military Division under the command of Col. Kangleon was established in the Poblacion and was named Camp Kalaw.

On September 4, 1954, Monkayo became a separate district and founded as a Municipality by virtue of a Presidential Executive Order No. 65 by then President Ramon Magsaysay of the Republic of the Philippines. The first mayor was Angelo Ortiz (Sept. 1954–Oct. 1955), who also was responsible for making Monkayo an independent municipality. Alejandro Peñaranda (Nov. 1955-Dec. 1955) was the shortest reigning mayor for only one month, the next appointed mayor who donated portion of his land which became part of the Municipal Town Site. He was followed by Severino Lacson (Jan. 1956-Nov. 1964), Jose T. Amacio (Nov. 1964-Mar. 1972), and Anastacio C. Basañes. After the EDSA Revolution, Mayor Anastacio Basañes was succeeded by Constantino Alcaraz (April 1986 – 1992) as Officer In-Charge by virtue of the Freedom Constitution implemented under President Corazon Aquino. He was succeeded by Rizal G. Gentugaya, and Avelino T. Cabag (1998 to 2001).

In September 1983, gold was discovered by a Lumad named Camilo Banad at Mount Diwata in the town's mountainous eastern portion. The deposits found were estimated to have contained $1.8 billion worth of untapped gold reserves. The discovery of such massive gold deposits triggered a massive gold rush of unprecedented scale by people from all over the Philippines into the mountain, that at one point the mining community at the mountain's slopes became home to some 100,000 to 130,000 inhabitants and prospectors by the late 1980's, making Monkayo one of the largest towns in Davao Region during this time. This led to the incorporation of the mining community on Mount Diwata into a barangay of Monkayo in 1987 via Provincial Proclamation No. 01 of the province of Davao del Norte, in which the town was a part of prior to the creation of the province of Compostela Valley, the present-day Davao de Oro, in 1998. The unorganized gold rush resulted in deaths of miners from mercury and lead poisoning, accidents and mine collapses, as well as killings from various groups including Lumad tribal militias, Communist rebels, segments of the Moro National Liberation Front, other paramilitary groups, mercenaries at the hire of giant corporations vying for the control of the numerous mines in the area, and government forces including the Army, police and the Constabulary trying to maintain or restore order. To prevent further incidents from happening as well as to regulate the otherwise unregulated mining in the area, President Gloria Macapagal Arroyo signed Proclamation No. 297 in year 2002 declaring a huge part of the mountain as a mineral reserve and an environmentally critical area. Despite the presidential proclamation and prior regulatory Republic Acts, however, the mining in the Diwalwal area continues to the present day.

On June 28, 2003, Mayor Joel Brillantes was assassinated by lone gunman Aniceto Dejeto Jr. in Davao City. Dejeto himself would be shot and killed shortly after by three unknown men according to Criminal Investigation and Detection Group Chief Eduardo Matillano.

Geography 

Climate

Barangays
Monkayo is politically subdivided into 21 barangays.

Demographics

It is the most populous among the municipalities of Compostela Valley.

Ethnic groups:
Mandayas
Dibabawons
Mansakas
Manobos

Religion 

The largest group is the Roman Catholic having 65% of the population, other Christian group comprises (Evangelicals, Born Again, Kingdom of Jesus Christ) comprises 10%, the Iglesia ni Cristo comprises 10% and the remaining 15% belong to the other non-Christian groups.

Roman Catholic: 65%
Islam: 12.5%
Iglesia ni Cristo 10%
Other Christian Groups: 10%

Economy

Tourism

Kumbilan Cave(Casoon) Kumbilan Cave has tunnel-like features and wide chambers laden with stalactites, stalagmites and other formations. Fauna observed within the cave are snakes and fruit flies. The cave is home to the "kabyaw" fruit bats.

Mt. Diwalwal A barangay of 18,000 people, mostly migrants from Surigao, Agusan and Cebu - all dependent on gold. Small-scale mining has been their major industry since the gold-rush in the area in the 1980s. Diwalwal is a relatively quiet town but recently caught the headlines when an estimated 25 miners died on October 25 inside a tunnel allegedly due to toxic gas suffocation.

Seven Waterfalls of Awao The gushing water coming from above are not that high in volume but cold but not chilling; it is noticeable that the fauna on its surroundings as well as the moss that was formed above the rocks where the falls are flowing are still thick indicating that this falls is not frequently visited by outsiders.

Octagon Farm This is man-made wonder owned by Congressman Manuel Zamora Sr., it has been visited by various personalities, Josh Hartnett being one of them.

Upper Ulip Hot Spring This is one of the nearest springs near the famed Mount Diwata.

Sagay and Pasian Falls These are the falls that remain untouched by modernity.

Culture

Another Spanish influence that remains up to this day is the observance and celebration of barrios, or villages, of the day of their respective patron saint called "Fiesta". It is in these celebrations wherein songs, dances and other forms of arts and merrymaking from various cultures have evolved creatively into the sights and sounds of Monkayo now.

Kariyawan Festival Kariyawan Festival which is celebrated every September 4 is also one of the highlights in the municipality. This tells of the story of a diwata who has protected the people of Monkayo and who has given the first gold to the people.

Binibining Monkayo Is the organization responsible for sponsoring the annual town beauty pageant which selects the beautiful girl throughout the municipality of Monkayo.

Drum and Bugle Is a musical marching unit (similar to a marching band) consisting of brass instruments, percussion instruments, and color guard. Typically operating as independent non-profit organizations, they perform in competitions, parades, festivals, and other civic functions. Participants from different schools throughout the town compete for the title.

Monkayo Fiesta Monkayo's celebration of the Feast of St. Ignatius de Loyola every July 31.

Araw ng Monkayo The celebration falls on the fourth day of September.

Transportation 

There are various means to travel to Monkayo. The common modes of transportation within the municipality are multicabs, jeepneys, motorcycles. Tricycles play the routes that are outside the main streets of the town. In mountainous areas, the habal-habal passenger motorcycle is the main mode of transportation.

Education

Elementary

There are 37 public elementary schools within Monkayo, namely;

There are also three private elementary schools, namely;

 Casa Amazing Grace School- Poblacion
 Agape Christian Academy
 Casa Amazing Grace School- Mt. Diwata

Secondary

Public High Schools:

Private High School:
Assumption Academy of Monkayo, Inc., located at Poblacion

Colleges and University

Monkayo College of Arts Science And Technology (MONCAST) - administered by the municipal government of Monkayo.
MATIF - TESDA accredited school

References

External links

 Monkayo Profile at the DTI Cities and Municipalities Competitive Index
 [ Philippine Standard Geographic Code]
 Philippine Census Information
 http://nap.psa.gov.ph/ru11/Municipal%20Profile/nabunturan/Nabunturan,%20Compostela%20Valley.pdf
 http://lgumonkayo.com/about_monkayo/aboutcont2.html
 https://web.archive.org/web/20100824132920/http://202.91.162.20/moncayo/features.html

Municipalities of Davao de Oro
Mining communities in the Philippines
Establishments by Philippine executive order